Teratobaikalia macrostoma is a species of a freshwater snail with an operculum, an aquatic gastropod mollusk in the family Amnicolidae.

Teratobaikalia macrostoma is the type species of the genus Teratobaikalia.

Distribution
Teratobaikalia macrostoma lives in the northern and central parts of Lake Baikal, in depths from 2 to 100 m. The type locality is Maloe More in Baikal.

Description
The shell has 4.5-5 whorls.
The width of the shell is 7.5–9 mm. The height of the shell is 8.75-11.5 mm.

References

External links 

Amnicolidae
Taxa named by Wassili Adolfovitch Lindholm
Gastropods described in 1909
Taxobox binomials not recognized by IUCN